Samuel Sim is a British composer, record producer, musician and songwriter. His work spans concert music, recordings, arrangements and film and television scores. He writes in full orchestral as well as electronic and contemporary idioms, and is often known for his use of choir and vocal elements in his music.

Recent releases include the Ivor Novello Award nominated score for the Bafta Award winning series The Mill, the multi-award-winning soundtrack for Home Fires, released 6 May 2016 by Sony Classical Records. and the music to The Halcyon released by Decca Records in January 2017.

Biography

Film and television scores

2021
 Domina
 Innocent II (TV series)
 The Feast
 The Bay: Season III

2020
 Maiden
 The Bay: Season II
 The Spanish Princess (TV series)
 Murder in the Carpark (TV series)

2019

 Anne (TV Mini-series)
 The Cure (Movie)
 The Bay
 The Victim
 The Dark Crystal: Age of Resistance (with Daniel Pemberton)

2018
 Maiden
 The Interrogation of Tony Martin (TV Movie)
 Innocent
2017
 Maigret in Montmartre
 Unspeakable
 Diana
 On a Knife Edge
 Paula
 Born to Kill
 Maigret: Night at the Crossroads
 The Halcyon
2016
 Maigret's Dead Man
 Home Fires – Season II
 Murdered by My Father
 Maigret Sets a Trap
2015
 Home Fires – Season I
 Coalition
 Chasing Shadows

2014
 The Mill – Season II
 Stop at Nothing
2013
 By Any Means
 Women Behind Bars
 A Touch of Cloth – Season II
 Ice Cream Girls
 Lad: A Yorkshire Story
 Salma
 Inside Death Row

2012
 In the Shadow of the Sun
 We Are Poets
 Fathers Day
 Of Two Minds
 Mad Dogs
2011
 Combat Hospital 
 The Reckoning
2010
 The Deep
 Flak
 10 Minute Tales

2009
 Emma
 The Damned United
 W.M.D.
 Snowblind
 Kröd Mändoon
 Iran and the West 
 Ghosts of the 7th Cavalry

2008
 House of Saddam

2007
 Awake
 Only Human

2006
 "Bobby"
 "Doogal"

2005
 "Dunkirk"

Soundtrack releases 

 Emma A recording of Sim's soundtrack for the 2009 BBC television drama of Jane Austen's Emma was released on 1 December 2009
 Mad Dogs – Original Television Soundtrack – Red Stamp Records – 2012
 The Mill – Original Television Soundtrack for Channel 4's drama series was released Feb 2015 on Red Stamp Records
 Coalition Original Soundtrack – Red Stamp Records – 2015
 Home Fires Soundtrack featuring the single Siren released 6 May 2016 by Sony Classical Records.
 The Halcyon – Original Television Soundtrack featuring the hit single Hourglass written and produced by Samuel Sim, feat. Tracy Kashi on Vocals was released by Decca Records in January 2017
 On a Knife Edge – Original Motion Picture Soundtrack released January 2018
 The Bay – Original Television Soundtrack released March 2022
 Domina – Original Television Soundtrack – Dubois Records – 2021

Awards and nominations

References

External links
Official Site

Emma CD soundtrack information
The Ivors Academy | Champions of Music Creators

English film score composers
English male film score composers
Living people
Postminimalist composers
Experimental composers
20th-century British male musicians
Year of birth missing (living people)